Xiangyang Road Subdistrict is a subdistrict situated on the northwestern corner of Nankai District, Tianjin, China. It borders Xiyingmen and Shaogongzhuang Subdistricts in the north, Changhong Subdistrict in the east, Jialing Avenue Subdistrict in the south, and Zhongbei Town in the west. As of 2010, 145,263 residents were counted for this su bdistrict.

The subdistrict was formed in 1975 from part of Xiyingmenwai Subdistrict, and was named after Xiangyang Road under its administration in 1978.

Geography 
Xiangyang Road subdistrict situates on the south of Nanyun River. Part of Chentangzhuang Branch Railway passes through the subdistrict.

Administrative divisions 
Below is a list of the 16 residential communities under Xiangyang Road Subdistrict by the end of 2021:

References 

Township-level divisions of Tianjin
Nankai District, Tianjin